State Road 426 (SR 426) is a major road in Orange and Seminole counties, entirely north of Orlando. Its length is closely similar to SR 438. East of here, the road continues as County Road 426 (CR 426) as a direct route to Mims and Scottsmoor, the census-designated places of Brevard County, terminating at SR 46.

SR 426 is signed east–west, but takes a diagonal path through the Orlando-Kissimmee, Florida, Metropolitan Statistical Area and rural Seminole County, by the Econlockhatchee River.

Route description
SR 426 starts at SR 424 as Fairbanks Avenue in Fairview Shores, and starts off as an undivided, 4 lane road. In an instant, I-4 forms a diamond interchange. Notice that Interstate 4 is running northwest–southeast. SR 426 leaves unincorporated Orange County and into Winter Park. At the corner of SR 426 and Denning Drive, a sinkhole comes in sight, however, it was turned into a man-made lake. SR 527 merges on Fairbanks Avenue as the northern terminus of SR 527, which leads to Kissimmee. It crosses 2 railroad tracks after the merge. SR 426 enters Historical Downtown Winter Park and changes names from Fairbanks Avenue to Aloma Avenue. SR 426 exits Winter Park and intersects SR 436 where it becomes a divided highway. Briefly passing through Goldenrod and the beginning of SR 551 it finally enters Seminole County and heads NNE. After the interchange of SR 417 it parallels that toll road for several miles. Just after Red Bug Lake Road, SR 426 turns into a 2+1 road. Entering Downtown Oviedo, SR 426 is two lanes wide, and intersects SR 434/SR 419. SR 426 forks off Broadway Street and becomes Geneva Road. SR 426 becomes County Road 426. Now leaving the
Orlando-Kissimmee, Florida, Metropolitan Statistical Area and the City of Oviedo, it runs along the Econlockhatchee River for a short time. Entering Geneva, CR 426 ends at SR 46. Turning left leads to Sanford. Turning right leads to Mims and Scottsmoor.

History
SR 202 was defined without a number by 1931 state law, chapter 14920, approved May 29, 1931: "That certain road beginning at the southwest corner of the southeast quarter of section 28, township 20, range 32, in Seminole County, Florida, where it intersects with State Road number 44, and running in a southwesterly direction along the paved road as now located and known as the Oviedo-Geneva Road to the intersection of Broadway and Bay Streets in Oviedo, Florida; and thence running west approximately five-eighths of a mile, thence in a southwesterly direction along the present paved road as now located and now known as the Oviedo-Winter Park Road, to its intersection with the Orange County line at the southwest corner of the southeast quarter of the southeast quarter of section 35, township 21, range 30, in the County of Seminole and State of Florida; thence continuing and following the present paved road to the point where said road intersects with the city limits of the Town of Winter Park, Florida."

In modern-day terms, this road is CR 426 and SR 426 from Old Mims Road south of Geneva to just east of Lakemont Avenue in Winter Park, with a few realignments in Oviedo.

SR 202 was extended west without a number in 1935 state law chapter 17306, filed May 29, 1935: "A certain road described as an extension of State Road No. 202, beginning at the East City limits of Winter Park, in Orange County, through Winter Park and on Fairbanks Avenue to the old Apopka Brick Road, thence northwesterly crossing the Seaboard Air Line Railroad, turning left and intersecting State Road No. 2, thence Westerly through Clarcona intersecting Apopka-Ocoee Road one-quarter mile South of Atlantic Coast Line Railroad."

This road is now known as SR 426 (with a slight change in downtown Winter Park), SR 424, CR 424, and Clarcona-Ocoee Road, ending at CR 437 (which was added to the State Road system as an extension of SR 24 in 1935).

In the 1945 renumbering, SR 202 east of Orange Avenue (then SR 3A, now SR 527) became part of SR 426. The rest was not given a number; parts later became SR 424A (now SR 426) and SR 424.

Major intersections

References

External links

426
426
426
426